Longzihu District is a district of the city of Bengbu, Anhui Province, China.

Qiugang village
The release in 2010 of a documentary called The Warriors of Qiugang: A Chinese Village Fights Back, chronicles how the  village residents of Qiugang mobilized themselves to stop the local factory Jiucailuo from producing pesticides and herbicides which severely affected their living conditions.

Administrative divisions
Nowadays, Longzihu District is divided to 6 subdistricts, 1 town and 1 township.
6 Subdistricts

1 Town
 Changhuaiwei

1 Township
 Lilou

References

External links

Bengbu